William Arthur Masse (born July 6, 1966) is a retired professional baseball outfielder who competed for the United States national baseball team in the 1988 Summer Olympics.

A native of Manchester, Connecticut, Masse attended Davidson College and Wake Forest University. From 1985 to 1987, he played collegiate summer baseball with the Cotuit Kettleers of the Cape Cod Baseball League and was named a league all-star in 1985 and 1987. 

The New York Yankees drafted Masse in the seventh round of the 1988 Major League Baseball Draft. After his retirement as a player, he served as a minor league baseball manager.

References

External links

1966 births
Living people
Albany-Colonie Yankees players
Baseball coaches from Connecticut
Baseball outfielders
Baseball players at the 1988 Summer Olympics
Baseball players from Connecticut
Columbus Clippers players
Cotuit Kettleers players
Davidson Wildcats baseball players
Medalists at the 1988 Summer Olympics
Miami Marlins scouts
New Hampshire Fisher Cats managers
Olympic gold medalists for the United States in baseball
Sportspeople from Manchester, Connecticut
Prince William Cannons players
San Antonio Missions managers
Seattle Mariners scouts
Trenton Thunder managers
Wake Forest Demon Deacons baseball players